Adlène Hicheur (born 4 December 1976) is a particle physicist with dual Algerian and French citizenship. After his master of theoretical physics in Lyon, he joined LAPP (Laboratoire d'Annecy le Vieux de Physique des Particules) to work on the BaBar experiment, located at the Stanford Linear Accelerator Center. His thesis, defended in 2003, was about the production of high energy Eta prime mesons in the decays of B mesons. After that he was a Postdoctorate in England at the Rutherford Appleton Laboratory, where he worked on the ATLAS experiment at LHC. He then joined the high energy physics department of École Polytechnique Fédérale de Lausanne (EPFL) and works currently on the LHCb experiment.

Adlène Hicheur was arrested in France on 8 October 2009, after police allegedly intercepted emails between himself and Al-Qaida in Islamic Maghreb, an Algerian-based terrorist organisation. Two weeks after his arrest, the Algerian media compared Hicheur to Lotfi Raissi, who was first suspected of terrorism before being released without charges. An International Support Committee was organized by Adlene's friends and colleagues to support Adlene and to request a fair investigation.

General director of the National Police Frédéric Péchenard stated in November 2009 that Hicheur planned to attack a base of the National Defence in Annecy, which harbours the 27ème bataillon de chasseurs alpins, involved in Afghanistan.

Hicheur's trial started on 29 March 2012 in Paris. In May 2012 Hicheur was sentenced to "five years in prison for plotting terrorist attacks." On 15 May Hicheur left prison and decided not to appeal against his sentence. He was a visiting professor at Instituto de Física of Universidade Federal do Rio de Janeiro, Rio de Janeiro, Brazil.

In July 2016, the government of Brazil had Hicheur deported back to France, where he was placed under house arrest. Hicheur has decided to renounce his French citizenship and move to Algeria.

References

External links 
 For Adlene Hicheur.Tommaso Dorigo's blog.
 Setting the record straight by M. Dittmar - PhysicsWorld
 Physicist’s Jailing Is Veiled in Mystery
 Letter to the President of the French Republic
 Letter to the President of the French Republic (English)
 Stratfor: The curious case of Adlene Hicheur
 Nature: Particle physicist 'falsely accused', claims brother
 CERN Scientist arrested
 CERN Physicist arrested
 Nuclear Physicist arrested in France
 Hadron Collider physicist
 French Physicist arrested
 Top Physicist arrested in France
 Nuclear Physicist Arrested For Suspected Terror Links
 French judge files terror-linked charges against arrested physicist
 Terrorism Charges pressed on French physicist
 Scientist on French terror charge
 Colleagues Offer New Details on Al-Qaeda Suspect: Devout, Genial, They Say
 Reaction of Hicheur's brother and Hicheur's lawyer
 Reaction of Hicheur former' advisor
 
 Adlène Hicheur : un comité de soutien
 Scientific publications of Adlène Hicheur on INSPIRE-HEP

French physicists
1976 births
Living people
People associated with CERN
Academic staff of the Federal University of Rio de Janeiro